Gigantoscorpionidae is an extinct family of scorpions that lived between 383.7million and 342.8million years ago, during the Devonian and Carboniferous periods. The family is the only member of the superfamily Gigantoscorpionoidea.

Genera
The family contains two genera:
 Gigantoscorpio Størmer, 1963
 Petaloscorpio Kjellesvig-Waering, 1986

References

†
Prehistoric scorpions